Paralopostega is a genus of moths of the family Opostegidae.

Etymology
The generic name is derived from the Greek paralos (near the sea) prefixed to the generic stem opostega, in reference to the oceanic distribution of this group. It is feminine in gender.

Species
Paralopostega callosa (Swezey, 1921)
Paralopostega dives (Walsingham, 1907)
Paralopostega filiforma (Swezey, 1921)
Paralopostega maculata (Walsingham, 1907)
Paralopostega peleana (Swezey, 1921)
Paralopostega serpentina (Swezey, 1921)

External links
Generic Revision of the Opostegidae, with a Synoptic Catalog of the World's Species (Lepidoptera: Nepticuloidea)

Opostegidae
Endemic moths of Hawaii
Monotrysia genera